Novosibirsk Institute of Program Systems is a scientific organization in Sovetsky District of Novosibirsk, Russia. It was founded in 1972.

History
In 1972, a branch of the Lebedev Institute of Precision Mechanics and Computer Engineering was established in Novosibirsk.

In 1992, the branch became an independent organization.

In 2002, 240 people worked at the institute.

Activity
The organizstion is engaged in the development of automated control systems. It created automated control systems for the Diamonds of Russia – Sakha, Surgut-1 Power Station etc.

References

Research institutes in Novosibirsk
1972 establishments in the Soviet Union
Research institutes established in 1972
Automation organizations